Cucullia pustulata is a species of moth belonging to the family Noctuidae.

It is native to Eurasia.

References

pustulata
Moths described in 1842